Thomas Ronald Manley (7 October 1912 – 4 July 1988) was an English professional footballer who made over 300 appearances in the Football League for Manchester United and Brentford as a utility player. He later managed hometown club Northwich Victoria.

Playing career

Early years 
Manley began his career with junior clubs Brunner Mond and Norley United, before joining Cheshire County League club Northwich Victoria in 1929. He remained at Drill Field until September 1930.

Manchester United 
Manley was brought to First Division club Manchester United by scout Louis Rocca on an amateur basis in September 1930. At the end of the 1930–31 season, after the club's relegation to the Second Division, he signed a professional contract. Manley broke into the team over the course of the 1932–33 and 1933–34 seasons and scored 15 goals in United's 1935–36 Second Division title-winning campaign. After suffering relegation straight back to the Second Division at the end of the 1936–37 season, he helped the team to an immediate return to the top-flight one season later. 1938–39 was Manley's final season at Old Trafford and he finished his Manchester United career having made 195 appearances and scored 41 goals. Predominantly an outside left, he also performed the role of a utility player at Old Trafford by also playing in half and full back positions.

Brentford 
Manley joined First Division club Brentford for a "substantial fee" in August 1939 and was immediately named captain. Just three matches of the 1939–40 season were played before the season was abandoned and competitive football was suspended for the duration of the Second World War. Manley's duties with the RAF meant that he appeared sparingly for the club during the war, making just 36 appearances and scoring six goals by the end of the 1945–46 season. Competitive football resumed for the 1946–47 season and Manley would go on to make 122 appearances and scored 8 goals for the club before making his final appearance in September 1950. He remained as Griffin Park as a reserve team player for the 1951–52 season (playing one match as a goalkeeper) before retiring at age 39 in May 1952. Manley was awarded a joint-testimonial with Ted Gaskell versus a Tommy Lawton XI in April 1954.

Management career 
Manley managed Cheshire County League club Northwich Victoria, with whom he began his career as a player, between March and October 1954.

Personal life
Manley served in the RAF during the Second World War. After his retirement from football, he became the licensee of a pub in Northwich.

Career statistics

Honours 
Manchester United
 Football League Second Division: 1935–36
 Football League Second Division second-place promotion: 1937–38

References

1912 births
1988 deaths
Sportspeople from Northwich
English footballers
Northwich Victoria F.C. players
Manchester United F.C. players
Brentford F.C. players
Northwich Victoria F.C. managers
English Football League players
Association football outside forwards
Association football wing halves
Association football fullbacks
Royal Air Force personnel of World War II
English football managers